Yuriy Zhuravskyi or Yurii Zhuravskyi, sometimes Yuriy Zhuravskiy (born 10 April 1974) is a Ukrainian former bobsledder and decathlete. He competed in the four man bobsleigh event at the 2002 Winter Olympics. In decathlon, he won a national title at the Ukrainian Athletics Championships in 1999.

References

External links
 

1974 births
Living people
Sportspeople from Kyiv
Ukrainian male bobsledders
Ukrainian decathletes
Olympic bobsledders of Ukraine
Bobsledders at the 2002 Winter Olympics
Ukrainian Athletics Championships winners